Mavinkurve is a village in Honnavar Taluk, Karnataka, India. Its population is approximately 12,000.

Communities, Languages, and Culture 
Mavinkurve consists mainly of Hindus of many communities, including such as Kharvi, Mogera, Mogaveera, Namadhari Naiks or Poojari(Billavas), and Kunabis, as well as a few Christians and Muslims.

Languages spoken in Mavinkurve include Konkani (a majority at 60%), Kannada, Urdu, and Nawayathi. Residents celebrate the holidays of Ganesh Chathurthi, Deepavali, Navarathri, Sharadothsava, Holi, Ramzan, Bakrid, and Christmas.

References 

Villages in Uttara Kannada district